Panhellenic Citizen Chariot  is a Greek anti-austerity party.

The party was formed by two MPs of the Panhellenic Socialist Movement, Giannis Dimaras and Vasilis Oikonomou. On October 20, 2011 Vasilis Oikonomou decided to form his own movement under the name "Free Citizens".

On 17 April 2012, an election cooperation agreement with the conservative anti-austerity party Independent Greeks was reached. The leader Giannis Dimaras and Gabriel Avramidis were elected with the Independent Greeks in Athens B and Thessaloniki A constituencies, respectively.

References

External links
 
 http://panellinioarmapoliton.blogspot.gr/

Political parties established in 2011
2011 establishments in Greece